A design change is the modification conducted to the product. It can happen at any stage in the product development process.

The design changes that happen early in the design process are less expensive when compared to those that take place after it is introduced into full-scale production. The cost of the change increases with its development time. Fundamentally, the design changes can be classified into pre production and post production design changes. The pre-production changes can happen in the conceptual design stage, prototype stage, detailing stage, testing stage. The post -production stage change will happen almost immediately the product is introduced into the production. This might be due to several reasons such as market response, design faults uncovering, design mistakes, not meeting customer requirements, so on and so forth. One of the tools to minimize this type of design change is House of Quality.

References

See also
 Change control
 Change management (engineering)
 Engineering change order

Further reading
Hauser J R, Clausing D, "The House of Quality", Harvard Business Review

Design